John Stefanos Paraskevopoulos (June 20, 1889 – March 15, 1951) also known as John Paras, was a Greek/South African astronomer. He was born in Piraeus, Greece and graduated from the University of Athens, where he obtained his PhD in Physics in 1910, under the supervision of Timoleon A. Argyropoulos. His thesis was entitled "Variability in absorption spectra". He served in the Greek army during the Balkan Wars and World War I. He work as an assistant of Prof. Demetrios Eginitis at the National Observatory of Athens, and in 1919, he went to the US with a two-year fellowship, spending part of that time working at Yerkes Observatory. There he met and married Dorothy W. Block. In 1921, he returned to Athens where he became head of the astronomy department of the National Observatory of Athens with a goal to built a large telescope in Greece. However, due to the war between Greece and Turkey during that period and the political instability that followed it soon became evident that the large telescope for the observatory would not materialise. So, in September 1923 Dr Paras accepted  an offer from Dr Harlow Shapley, to become the Superintendent of the Harvard Observatory's Southern Station. He left this post due to a lack of funding and went to Arequipa, Peru to work at Boyden Station, a branch of Harvard Observatory, with a view to finding a more suitable location for it. The decision was made to move Boyden Station to South Africa due to better weather conditions, and Paraskevopoulos served there as director of Boyden Observatory in South Africa from 1927 to 1951. He co-discovered a couple of comets. The  crater Paraskevopoulos on the Moon is named after him.

References

External links
 Dr. PARASKEVOPOULOS, John Stefanos

Obituaries
 JRASC 45 (1951) 126 (one paragraph)
 MNRAS 112 (1952) 277
Nature 167 (1951) 753
 Obs 71 (1951) 88 (one line)
 PASP 63 (1951) 212 (one paragraph)
 Sky and Telescope 10 (1951) 169

1889 births
1961 deaths
People from Piraeus
Harvard University staff
National and Kapodistrian University of Athens alumni
South African astronomers
20th-century Greek astronomers